Mustapha Sangaré (born 24 December 1998) is a French professional footballer who plays as a forward for Championnat National club Borgo on loan from Amiens.

Career
An amateur footballer for most of his early career, Sangaré signed a professional contract with Amiens SC on 6 November 2020. He first joined local club La Camillienne at age fifteen, where he started to coach kids at the age of seventeen. In doing so, he climbed 10 divisions from the start of the career into the Ligue 2. Sangaré made his professional debut with Amiens in a 0–0 Ligue 2 tie with Ajaccio on 22 December 2020.

On 30 September 2022, Sangaré was loaned to Borgo.

References

External links
 

1998 births
Footballers from Paris
Black French sportspeople
French sportspeople of Senegalese descent
Living people
French footballers
Association football forwards
Racing Club de France Football players
Amiens SC players
FC Bastia-Borgo players
Ligue 2 players
Championnat National players
Championnat National 3 players